Chermanangad (also spelled Cheramanagad and Chiramanangad) is a small village on the road between Kunnamkulam and Wadakanchery (Road No. SH50) in the Thrissur district of Kerala.

History

Prehistoric burial sites, commonly known as Kodakuthy Kallu (Kudakallu) [literally meaning "stones shaped like umbrellas"], were discovered here. These burial sites had stones placed like umbrellas over them. These stones have been over a period of time been plundered for construction and the remaining stones shifted to museums.

These umbrella rocks of Chiramanangad are reported to have a history of over four thousand years; here people were buried in earthen urns and umbrella rocks were placed on top as landmarks.

Economy
This largely rural area is gradually being converted to a small urban centre. Agricultural activity is disappearing with agricultural land being converted to housing plots. The village centre has a temple known as Kunnambathu Kavu.

Festivals
Every year Pooram is held at the village temple grounds on the 10th day of the Malayalam month Medam, approximately mid-April in the Gregorian calendar.

Transportation
The nearest railway stations to Chiramanangad are in Thrissur and Wadakanchery.

The nearest major towns are Kunnamkulam and Guruvayur.

Demographics
 India census, Chiramanangad had a population of 10,775 with 5126 males and 5649 females.

References
https://web.archive.org/web/20110721160226/http://www.townplanning.kerala.gov.in/Pages/Monuments%20Thrissur/index_files/22.jpg

External links

Wikimapia satellite map
 Weather at Chiramanangad:

Villages in Thrissur district